The Communauté d'agglomération Provence-Alpes or Provence-Alpes Agglomération is a French agglomeration community, created on 21 October 2016 (with effect from 1 January 2017), located in the department of Alpes-de-Haute-Provence, in region Provence-Alpes-Côte d'Azur. Its seat is Digne-les-Bains. Its area is 1574.0 km2. Its population was 47,382 in 2018, which is 29% of the population of Alpes-de-Haute-Provence.

It is one of the two agglomeration communities of the Alpes-de-Haute-Provence, the other being Durance-Luberon-Verdon Agglomération.

History 
Law no. 2015-991 of August 7, 2015 on the new territorial organization of the Republic, known as the NOTRe law, imposed their own taxation on public institutions with a population between 5,000 and 15,000 for inter-municipal cooperation.

The departmental inter-municipal cooperation plan (SDCI), unveiled in October 2015, proposed the merger of five communautés de communes: Asse-Bléone-Verdon, Pays de Seyne, Moyenne-Durance, Duyes et Bléone and Haute Bléone.

The withdrawal of Saint-Julien-d'Asse from the community of municipalities, so that it joins Durance Luberon Verdon agglomeration community (also called the Manosquin pôle), having been rejected, no other modification was made after the meeting of the departmental intercommunal cooperation commission on March 21, 2016, following the adoption of the SDCI on March 25.

The urban community was created by the prefectural no 2016-294-002 of 21 October 2016 with the name “Provence-Alpes Agglomération”.

Geography

Location 
The agglomération community is located from north to south of the department of Alpes-de-Haute-Provence, in the arrondissement of Digne-les-Bains.

Composition 
[
{
  "type": "ExternalData",
  "service": "geoshape",
  "ids": "Q404474",
  "properties": {
      "stroke": "#ff0000",
      "fill":"#ffb100",
      "stroke-width": 2,
      "description" : "Aiglun"
  }
},
{
  "type": "ExternalData",
  "service": "geoshape",
  "ids": "Q865227",
  "properties": {
      "stroke": "#ff0000",
      "fill":"#ffb100",
      "stroke-width": 2,
      "description" : "Archail"
  }
},
{
  "type": "ExternalData",
  "service": "geoshape",
  "ids": "Q1158268",
  "properties": {
      "stroke": "#ff0000",
      "fill":"#ffb100",
      "stroke-width": 2,
      "description" : "Auzet"
  }
},
{
  "type": "ExternalData",
  "service": "geoshape",
  "ids": "Q865218",
  "properties": {
      "stroke": "#ff0000",
      "fill":"#ffb100",
      "stroke-width": 2,
      "description" : "Barles"
  }
},
{
  "type": "ExternalData",
  "service": "geoshape",
  "ids": "Q1062143",
  "properties": {
      "stroke": "#ff0000",
      "fill":"#ffb100",
      "stroke-width": 2,
      "description" : "Barras"
  }
},
{
  "type": "ExternalData",
  "service": "geoshape",
  "ids": "Q473288",
  "properties": {
      "stroke": "#ff0000",
      "fill":"#ffb100",
      "stroke-width": 2,
      "description" : "Beaujeu"
  }
},
{
  "type": "ExternalData",
  "service": "geoshape",
  "ids": "Q867054",
  "properties": {
      "stroke": "#ff0000",
      "fill":"#ffb100",
      "stroke-width": 2,
      "description" : "Beynes"
  }
},
{
  "type": "ExternalData",
  "service": "geoshape",
  "ids": "Q865143",
  "properties": {
      "stroke": "#ff0000",
      "fill":"#ffb100",
      "stroke-width": 2,
      "description" : "Bras-d'Asse"
  }
},
{
  "type": "ExternalData",
  "service": "geoshape",
  "ids": "Q644032",
  "properties": {
      "stroke": "#ff0000",
      "fill":"#ffb100",
      "stroke-width": 2,
      "description" : "Le Brusquet"
  }
},
{
  "type": "ExternalData",
  "service": "geoshape",
  "ids": "Q865161",
  "properties": {
      "stroke": "#ff0000",
      "fill":"#ffb100",
      "stroke-width": 2,
      "description" : "Le Castellard-Mélan"
  }
},
{
  "type": "ExternalData",
  "service": "geoshape",
  "ids": "Q871184",
  "properties": {
      "stroke": "#ff0000",
      "fill":"#ffb100",
      "stroke-width": 2,
      "description" : "Le Chaffaut-Saint-Jurson"
  }
},
{
  "type": "ExternalData",
  "service": "geoshape",
  "ids": "Q865757",
  "properties": {
      "stroke": "#ff0000",
      "fill":"#ffb100",
      "stroke-width": 2,
      "description" : "Champtercier"
  }
},
{
  "type": "ExternalData",
  "service": "geoshape",
  "ids": "Q320205",
  "properties": {
      "stroke": "#ff0000",
      "fill":"#ffb100",
      "stroke-width": 2,
      "description" : "Château-Arnoux-Saint-Auban"
  }
},
{
  "type": "ExternalData",
  "service": "geoshape",
  "ids": "Q181306",
  "properties": {
      "stroke": "#ff0000",
      "fill":"#ffb100",
      "stroke-width": 2,
      "description" : "Digne-les-Bains"
  }
},
{
  "type": "ExternalData",
  "service": "geoshape",
  "ids": "Q322004",
  "properties": {
      "stroke": "#ff0000",
      "fill":"#ffb100",
      "stroke-width": 2,
      "description" : "Draix"
  }
},
{
  "type": "ExternalData",
  "service": "geoshape",
  "ids": "Q1020200",
  "properties": {
      "stroke": "#ff0000",
      "fill":"#ffb100",
      "stroke-width": 2,
      "description" : "Entrages"
  }
},
{
  "type": "ExternalData",
  "service": "geoshape",
  "ids": "Q391103",
  "properties": {
      "stroke": "#ff0000",
      "fill":"#ffb100",
      "stroke-width": 2,
      "description" : "L'Escale"
  }
},
{
  "type": "ExternalData",
  "service": "geoshape",
  "ids": "Q865155",
  "properties": {
      "stroke": "#ff0000",
      "fill":"#ffb100",
      "stroke-width": 2,
      "description" : "Estoublon"
  }
},
{
  "type": "ExternalData",
  "service": "geoshape",
  "ids": "Q1020628",
  "properties": {
      "stroke": "#ff0000",
      "fill":"#ffb100",
      "stroke-width": 2,
      "description" : "Ganagobie"
  }
},
{
  "type": "ExternalData",
  "service": "geoshape",
  "ids": "Q858530",
  "properties": {
      "stroke": "#ff0000",
      "fill":"#ffb100",
      "stroke-width": 2,
      "description" : "Hautes-Duyes"
  }
},
{
  "type": "ExternalData",
  "service": "geoshape",
  "ids": "Q990110",
  "properties": {
      "stroke": "#ff0000",
      "fill":"#ffb100",
      "stroke-width": 2,
      "description" : "La Javie"
  }
},
{
  "type": "ExternalData",
  "service": "geoshape",
  "ids": "Q1020321",
  "properties": {
      "stroke": "#ff0000",
      "fill":"#ffb100",
      "stroke-width": 2,
      "description" : "Majastres"
  }
},
{
  "type": "ExternalData",
  "service": "geoshape",
  "ids": "Q1018567",
  "properties": {
      "stroke": "#ff0000",
      "fill":"#ffb100",
      "stroke-width": 2,
      "description" : "Malijai"
  }
},
{
  "type": "ExternalData",
  "service": "geoshape",
  "ids": "Q1018627",
  "properties": {
      "stroke": "#ff0000",
      "fill":"#ffb100",
      "stroke-width": 2,
      "description" : "Mallefougasse-Augès"
  }
},
{
  "type": "ExternalData",
  "service": "geoshape",
  "ids": "Q1018630",
  "properties": {
      "stroke": "#ff0000",
      "fill":"#ffb100",
      "stroke-width": 2,
      "description" : "Mallemoisson"
  }
},
{
  "type": "ExternalData",
  "service": "geoshape",
  "ids": "Q1018575",
  "properties": {
      "stroke": "#ff0000",
      "fill":"#ffb100",
      "stroke-width": 2,
      "description" : "Marcoux"
  }
},
{
  "type": "ExternalData",
  "service": "geoshape",
  "ids": "Q473275",
  "properties": {
      "stroke": "#ff0000",
      "fill":"#ffb100",
      "stroke-width": 2,
      "description" : "Les Mées"
  }
},
{
  "type": "ExternalData",
  "service": "geoshape",
  "ids": "Q1002067",
  "properties": {
      "stroke": "#ff0000",
      "fill":"#ffb100",
      "stroke-width": 2,
      "description" : "Mézel"
  }
},
{
  "type": "ExternalData",
  "service": "geoshape",
  "ids": "Q1018645",
  "properties": {
      "stroke": "#ff0000",
      "fill":"#ffb100",
      "stroke-width": 2,
      "description" : "Mirabeau"
  }
},
{
  "type": "ExternalData",
  "service": "geoshape",
  "ids": "Q1093032",
  "properties": {
      "stroke": "#ff0000",
      "fill":"#ffb100",
      "stroke-width": 2,
      "description" : "Montclar"
  }
},
{
  "type": "ExternalData",
  "service": "geoshape",
  "ids": "Q244546",
  "properties": {
      "stroke": "#ff0000",
      "fill":"#ffb100",
      "stroke-width": 2,
      "description" : "Moustiers-Sainte-Marie"
  }
},
{
  "type": "ExternalData",
  "service": "geoshape",
  "ids": "Q374183",
  "properties": {
      "stroke": "#ff0000",
      "fill":"#ffb100",
      "stroke-width": 2,
      "description" : "Peyruis"
  }
},
{
  "type": "ExternalData",
  "service": "geoshape",
  "ids": "Q1018657",
  "properties": {
      "stroke": "#ff0000",
      "fill":"#ffb100",
      "stroke-width": 2,
      "description" : "Prads-Haute-Bléone"
  }
},
{
  "type": "ExternalData",
  "service": "geoshape",
  "ids": "Q1381831",
  "properties": {
      "stroke": "#ff0000",
      "fill":"#ffb100",
      "stroke-width": 2,
      "description" : "La Robine-sur-Galabre"
  }
},
{
  "type": "ExternalData",
  "service": "geoshape",
  "ids": "Q1016914",
  "properties": {
      "stroke": "#ff0000",
      "fill":"#ffb100",
      "stroke-width": 2,
      "description" : "Sainte-Croix-du-Verdon"
  }
},
{
  "type": "ExternalData",
  "service": "geoshape",
  "ids": "Q1017371",
  "properties": {
      "stroke": "#ff0000",
      "fill":"#ffb100",
      "stroke-width": 2,
      "description" : "Saint-Jeannet"
  }
},
{
  "type": "ExternalData",
  "service": "geoshape",
  "ids": "Q1016759",
  "properties": {
      "stroke": "#ff0000",
      "fill":"#ffb100",
      "stroke-width": 2,
      "description" : "Saint-Julien-d'Asse"
  }
},
{
  "type": "ExternalData",
  "service": "geoshape",
  "ids": "Q580419",
  "properties": {
      "stroke": "#ff0000",
      "fill":"#ffb100",
      "stroke-width": 2,
      "description" : "Saint-Jurs"
  }
},
{
  "type": "ExternalData",
  "service": "geoshape",
  "ids": "Q1016772",
  "properties": {
      "stroke": "#ff0000",
      "fill":"#ffb100",
      "stroke-width": 2,
      "description" : "Saint-Martin-lès-Seyne"
  }
},
{
  "type": "ExternalData",
  "service": "geoshape",
  "ids": "Q1112934",
  "properties": {
      "stroke": "#ff0000",
      "fill":"#ffb100",
      "stroke-width": 2,
      "description" : "Selonnet"
  }
},
{
  "type": "ExternalData",
  "service": "geoshape",
  "ids": "Q842778",
  "properties": {
      "stroke": "#ff0000",
      "fill":"#ffb100",
      "stroke-width": 2,
      "description" : "Seyne"
  }
},
{
  "type": "ExternalData",
  "service": "geoshape",
  "ids": "Q1016821",
  "properties": {
      "stroke": "#ff0000",
      "fill":"#ffb100",
      "stroke-width": 2,
      "description" : "Thoard"
  }
},
{
  "type": "ExternalData",
  "service": "geoshape",
  "ids": "Q521571",
  "properties": {
      "stroke": "#ff0000",
      "fill":"#ffb100",
      "stroke-width": 2,
      "description" : "Verdaches"
  }
},
{
  "type": "ExternalData",
  "service": "geoshape",
  "ids": "Q1016951",
  "properties": {
      "stroke": "#ff0000",
      "fill":"#ffb100",
      "stroke-width": 2,
      "description" : "Le Vernet"
  }
},
{
  "type": "ExternalData",
  "service": "geoshape",
  "ids": "Q326027",
  "properties": {
      "stroke": "#ff0000",
      "fill":"#ffb100",
      "stroke-width": 2,
      "description" : "Volonne"
  }
},
{
  "type": "ExternalData",
  "service": "geoline",
  "ids": "Q3131",
 "properties": {
    "description":"Alpes-de-Haute-Provence"
    }
}
]

The agglomeration community is made up of 46 communes:

Executive

President 
Patricia Granet-Brunello (DVG) is the president of the community since 2017.

Vice-Presidents

References 

Provence-Alpes
Intercommunalities of Alpes-de-Haute-Provence